Psaphis is a genus of moths in the family Zygaenidae first described by Francis Walker in 1854. It is found in Southeast Asia and Australasia.

Species
The Catalogue of Life lists the following species, some of which appear to be synonyms:

References

External links
 

Chalcosiinae
Moths of Asia
Zygaenidae genera
Taxa named by Francis Walker (entomologist)